HMS Mersey was a  monitor of the Royal Navy.

Service history
Mersey had a relatively successful career in the First World War and had two prominent incidents. At the Battle of the Yser in 1914, off the coast of Belgium, she bombarded German troops as well as artillery positions. In July 1915, she was towed to the Rufiji River delta in German East Africa, where she and Severn then assisted in the destruction of the German light cruiser .

The monitor later went to the Mediterranean and served on the River Danube.

Five crew died between January 3 and January 6, 1919. They are buried at the Commonwealth War Graves Commission Bucharest War Cemetery.

In 1921, she was sold to the breakers.

Battle honours
Battle of the Yser 1914–1915
 1915

References

Notes

Citations

References

 

Javary-class monitors
Ships built on the River Tyne
1913 ships
Humber-class monitors
World War I monitors of the United Kingdom